

{{DISPLAYTITLE:Psi2 Aurigae}}

Psi2 Aurigae, Latinized from ψ2 Aurigae, is a star in the constellation Auriga. It is faintly visible to the naked eye with an apparent visual magnitude of 4.79. At that distance, the brightness of the star is diminished by 0.07 in magnitude from extinction caused by interstellar gas and dust.

Most studies categorized this as a K-type giant star with a stellar classification of K3 III. However, the results of a study published in 2003 list it with a classification of K3 Iab:, which would instead suggest it is a supergiant star. At the estimated distance of this star, this yields a physical size of about 27 times the radius of the Sun. It is radiating 304 times the Sun's luminosity from its enlarged photosphere at an effective temperature of 4,410 K.

It was also known to be part of a much bigger constellation named Telescopium Herschelii. It was also the constellation's brightest star before it was unrecognized by the International Astronomical Union (IAU).

See also
 Psi Aurigae

References

External links
 HR 2427
 CCDM J06394+4229
 Image Psi2 Aurigae

Auriga (constellation)
K-type giants
Aurigae, Psi02
Aurigae, 50
047174
031832
2427
Durchmusterung objects